Cristian Cominelli (born 22 May 1988) is an Italian cyclo-cross cyclist.

Major results

Cyclo-cross

2005–2006
 1st  National Junior Championships
2006–2007
 2nd National Under-23 Championships
2007–2008
 1st  National Under-23 Championships
 2nd National Championships
 2nd Ciclocross Del Ponte
 3rd  UCI Under-23 World Championships
2008–2009
 4th UCI Under-23 World Championships
 5th Overall UCI Under-23 World Cup
2nd Heusden-Zolder
2009–2010
 1st  National Under-23 Championships
 UCI Under-23 World Cup
3rd Treviso
2010–2011
 2nd Gran Premio Mamma E Papa Guerciotti
2011–2012
 1st Trofeo Rigoni di Asiago
 2nd Internationales Radquer Frenkendorf
 2nd Memorial Romano Scotti
 3rd National Championships
 3rd Valdidentro Night & Day Giro d'Italia Ciclocross
 3rd Int. Radquer Hittnau
2015–2016
 1st Giro d'Italia Cross # 2
 1st Giro d'Italia Cross # 4
 1st International Cyclocross Selle SMP
 3rd National Championships
2016–2017
 1st Gran Premio Città di Vittorio Veneto
2017–2018
 1st Gran Premio Città di Vittorio Veneto
2018–2019
 2nd Overall SMP Master Cross
 3rd Gran Premio Citta di Vittorio Veneto
 3rd Trofeo di Gorizia
2019–2020
 1st GP Citta Di Jesolo
 1st Il Melo Cup
 3rd Gran Premio Guerciotti
2020–2021
 3rd National Championships

MTB
2006
 2nd  Team relay, UCI World Championships
2008
 3rd  Team relay, UCI World Championships
2009
 1st  Team relay, UCI World Championships

Road
2012
 7th Overall Course Cycliste de Solidarnosc et des Champions Olympiques

References

External links
 

1988 births
Living people
Cyclo-cross cyclists
Italian male cyclists
Italian mountain bikers
Cyclists from the Province of Brescia